Bologna Football Club 1909 will take part of the 2012–13 season in the Italian Serie A. They will also take part in the Coppa Italia. This will be fifth consecutive season in the top flight of Italian football for Bologna.

Kit

Overview

Key Dates 

2012

 4 May: Marco Di Vaio has announced that he will be leaving Bologna at the end of the season and confirmed that he is considering joining MLS outfit Montreal Impact.

Team Kit 
The kits for the 2012–13 season were made by the local Bolognese sportswear manufacture Macron, kit sponsor of Bologna since 2001. The kits were unveiled on 26 July, in the town of Andalo, the site of Bologna's preseason preparations. The home uniforms feature the classic red and blue stripes, and both the white way kit and anthracite third kit featuring blue and red trim around the collar.  All shirts will feature the renewed sponsorship deals with NGM Mobile and Serenissima Ceramica.

Transfer window

In 

Total Spending:  €9,760,000

Out 

Total Income:  €17,750,000

Net Income:  €7,990,000

Squad

First team

Out on loan

Pre-season and friendlies

Competitions

Serie A

League table

Matches

Coppa Italia

Statistics

Appearances and goals

|-
! colspan="10" style="background:#dcdcdc; text-align:center"| Goalkeepers

|-
! colspan="10" style="background:#dcdcdc; text-align:center"| Defenders

|-
! colspan="10" style="background:#dcdcdc; text-align:center"| Midfielders

|-
! colspan="10" style="background:#dcdcdc; text-align:center"| Forwards

|-
! colspan="10" style="background:#dcdcdc; text-align:center"| Players transferred out during the season

Top scorers
This includes all competitive matches.  The list is sorted by shirt number when total goals are equal.
{| class="wikitable sortable" style="font-size: 95%; text-align: center;"
|-
!width=15|
!width=15|
!width=15|
!width=15|
!width=150|Name
!width=80|Serie A
!width=80|Coppa Italia
!width=80|Total
|-
|1
|10
|FW
|
|Alberto Gilardino
|13
|0
|13
|-
|2
|23
|MF
|
|Alessandro Diamanti
|7
|1
|8
|-
|3
|18
|FW
|
|Manolo Gabbiadini
|6
|1
|7
|-
|=
|33
|MF
|
|Panagiotis Kone
|6
|1
|7
|-
|5
|6
|MF
|
|Saphir Taïder
|3
|2
|5
|-
|6
|77
|FW
|
|Cristian Pasquato
|2
|2
|4
|-
|7
|17
|MF
|
|Tiberio Guarente
|2
|0
|2
|-
|8
|
|
|
|Own Goals
|1
|0
|1
|-
|=
|9
|FW
|
|Davide Moscardelli
|1
|0
|1
|-
|=
|11
|DF
|
|Marco Motta
|1
|0
|1
|-
|=
|19
|MF
|
|Lazaros Christodoulopoulos
|1
|0
|1
|-
|=
|21
|DF
|
|Nicolò Cherubin
|1
|0
|1
|-
|=
|43
|DF
|
|Frederik Sørensen
|1
|0
|1
|-
|=
|90
|DF
|
|Daniele Portanova
|1
|0
|1

References

External links
Official Website 

2012-13
Italian football clubs 2012–13 season